The Kommunarka firing range, former dacha of secret police chief Genrikh Yagoda, was used as a burial ground from 1937 to 1941. Executions may have been carried out there by the NKVD during the Great Terror and until the war started; alternatively, bodies of those shot elsewhere might have been brought there for later interment. As Russian historian Arseny Roginsky explained: "firing range" was a popular euphemism adopted to describe mysterious and closely-guarded plots of land that the NKVD began to set aside for mass burials on the eve of the Great Terror.

Identifying the victims
Talking to Izvestiya in 2007 a representative of the Federal Security Service suggested that approximately 10,000 people had been killed and buried in mass graves at Kommunarka. Painstaking work by Memorial researchers and others in the 1990s established the identity of 4,527 known to be buried there. Their names were published in Memorial's first Book of Remembrance. Before Kommunarka opened as a memorial complex in 2018 an archaeological survey indicated that 6,600 bodies probably lay there, the total number of names since reached through further documentary research.

As with so many other "firing ranges" throughout the former Soviet Union, the FSB (successor to the KGB and the NKVD) retained control of the territory for many decades thereafter. Only in 1999, was the land transferred, as with the Butovo firing range south of Moscow, to the Russian Orthodox Church. Only on 14 November 1999 did a plaque commemorating the Victims of Political Repression at the "special installation" finally appear, later than at any other mass burial site in Moscow, comments Arseny Roginsky. A church dedicated to Russia's New Martyrs and Confessors, i.e. those who had died for their Christian faith during the Soviet period, was built at Kommunarka and their feast day was thereafter celebrated each year on or around 25 January.

Opening and controversy

On 27 October 2018 when the memorial site opened all 6,609 names of those known to be buried there were included on the Wall of Remembrance. A controversy then arose over the inclusion on the lists of some 50 high-ranking secret police officers (including Yagoda himself) none of whom had been rehabilitated.

The decision to use a single list was explained by Memorial (society) chairman Jan Raczynski, one of those who had taken part in discussions of the form the memorial complex should take: other partners in the project were the Gulag Museum, representatives of the buried victims, the Moscow city commission for the Victims of Political Repression and the Russian Orthodox Church. The committee concluded, said Racynski, that everyone deserved a grave to which relatives and descendants might come. This included all those who had been buried at Kommunarka but in no sense did it exonerate them of any earlier crimes.

Notable victims

 Yakov Agranov
 Tobias Akselrod
 Yakov Alksnis
 Anandyn Amar
 Vasily Anisimoff
 Nikolay Antipov
 Vladimir Antonov-Ovseyenko
 Juris Aploks
 Ernest Appoga
 Artur Artuzov
 Ölziin Badrakh
 Žanis Bahs
 Mikhail Batorsky
 Alexander Bekzadyan
 Abram Belenky
 Alexander Beloborodov
 Boris Berman
 Matvei Berman
 Eduard Berzin
 Reingold Berzin
 Yan Karlovich Berzin
 Anastasia Bitsenko
 Waclaw Bogucki
 Mykhailo Bondarenko
 Mieczysław Broński
 Pyotr Bryanskikh
 Andrei Bubnov
 Nikolai Bukharin
 Pavel Bulanov
 Dadash Bunyadzade
 Hayk Bzhishkyan
 Hugo Celmiņš
 Mikhail Chernov
 Sergey Chernykh
 Jūlijs Daniševskis
 Yakov Davydov
 Terenty Deribas
 Dansranbilegiin Dogsom
 Pavel Dybenko
 Robert Eikhe
 Ivan Fedko
 Peter Maximovich Feldman
 Filip Filipović
 Rashid Khan Gaplanov
 Ilya Garkavyi
 Aleksei Gastev
 Anatoliy Gekker
 Nikolai Gikalo
 Vladimir Gittis
 Vasily Glagolev
 Konstantin Grigorovich
 Edvard Gylling
 Hryhoriy Hrynko
 Akmal Ikramov
 Chingiz Ildyrym
 Uraz Isayev
 Vladimir Ivanov
 Bruno Jasieński
 Semyon Kamenev
 Grigory Kaminsky
 Georgii Karpechenko
 Innokenty Khalepsky
 Fayzulla Khodzhayev
 Vasiliy Khripin
 Grigory Kireyev
 Vladimir Kirshon
 Vladimir Klimovskikh
 Nikolai Klestov
 Vilhelm Knorin
 Lazar Kogan
 Nikolai Kondratiev
 August Kork
 Ivan Kosogov
 Yepifan Kovtyukh
 Nikolay Krestinsky
 Nikolai Krylenko
 Pyotr Kryuchkov
 Béla Kun
 Vladimir Lazarevich
 Eduard Lepin
 Izrail Leplevsky
 Mikhail Levandovsky
 Lev Levin
 Ivan Lorents
 Darizavyn Losol
 Dorjjavyn Luvsansharav
 Maksim Mager
 Theodore Maly
 Mykola Marchak
 Joseph Meerzon
 Shmarya Medalia
 Stanislav Messing
 Romuald Muklevich
 Georgii Nadson
 Jamshid Nakhchivanski
 Stepan Oborin
 Valerian Osinsky
 Eduard Pantserzhanskiy
 Karl Pauker
 Dmitry Pavlov
 Jēkabs Peterss
 Osip Piatnitsky
 Boris Pilnyak
 Yevgeny Polivanov
 Yakov Popok
 Bronislava Poskrebysheva
 Nikolay Rattel
 Arkady Rosengolts
 Kustaa Rovio
 Jānis Rudzutaks
 Alexei Rykov
 Turar Ryskulov
 Andrei Sazontov
 Vasily Schmidt
 Alexander Sedyakin
 Alexander Serebrovsky
 Suren Shadunts
 Vasily Sharangovich
 Zolbingiin Shijee
 Boris Shumyatsky
 Jan Spielrein
 Sergey Spigelglas
 Mikhail Svetšnikov
 Pavel Sytin
 Alexander Svechin
 Branislaw Tarashkyevich
 Alexander Tarasov-Rodionov
 Mikhail Trilisser
 Jozef Unszlicht
 Maksim Unt
 Semyon Uritsky
 Aleksandr Uspensky
 Leonid Ustrugov
 Jukums Vācietis
 Yakov Yakovlev
 Yefim Yevdokimov
 Konstantin Yurenev
 Leonid Zakovsky
 Isaak Zelensky
 Nikolai Zhilyayev
 Prokopy Zubarev

An elite burial ground
Leading Bolsheviks convicted at the two later Moscow Show Trials were among the many prominent Party leaders buried at Kommunarka, particularly those publicly tried convicted at the so-called Case of the Anti-Soviet "Bloc of Rightists and Trotskyites" in March 1938. (Some defendants from the second Show Trial in January 1937 like Beloborodov and Bubnov who were charged but did not appear in court were also buried at Kommunarka.)

Yagoda has already been mentioned. Most of the other defendants in the March 1938 Trial of the Twenty One are listed above: Bukharin, Rykov, Krestinsky, Rosengolts, Vladimir Ivanov, Mikhail Chernov, and Isaak Zelensky; Uzbek leaders Akmal Ikramov and Faizulla Khodjaev; Vasily Sharangovich, Prokopy Zubarev, and NKVD officer Pavel Bulanov; Kremlin doctors Lev Levin and Ignaty Kazakov; Venyamin Maximov-Dikovsky and Pyotr Kryuchkov, Maxim Gorky's secretary. (Missing from the list are Rakovsky, Bessonov and Pletnyov who were given heavy terms of imprisonment in 1938. Later they were summarily executed in 1941 during the first months of the war.)

Among the Mongolian revolutionaries (Badrakh, Dogsom, Losol, Luvsanshara and Shijee), the writers (Pilnyak, Kirshon, Jasienski), Red Army and NKVD officers (Agranov, the Berman brothers, Berzin, Kogan, Pauker) there were also two Central Europeans. Bela Kun headed the short-lived 1919 Soviet republic in Hungary; ex-priest Theodore Maly recruited Soviet agents abroad and in the mid-1930s was for a while handler of the Cambridge Five spy-ring.

See also 
  Butovo memorial complex, near Moscow
 Mass graves in the Soviet Union
 Memorial (society)
 Moscow Show Trials
 Sandarmokh memorial complex (Karelia)

References

External links
 
 List of those buried at Kommunarka, Memorial, 2000 (in Russian).
 Russia's Necropolis of Terror and the Gulag: A select directory of burial grounds and commemorative sites

Politics of the Soviet Union
NKVD
Political repression in the Soviet Union
Mass graves in Russia
Cemeteries in Russia
Politicides
Memorials to victims of communism
Execution sites
Cultural heritage monuments of regional significance in Moscow Oblast